Maikey Ko Dedo Sandees is a Pakistani Soap Opera that first aired on Geo Tv on 17 August 2015. It is on air every Monday to Friday at 7:00 p.m(PST).
The soap also reruns on Geo TV sister channel Geo Kahani.

Cast

Sonia Mishal as Maryam
Ali Abbas as Ahmer
Ghulam Mohiuddin as Maryam's father
Naima Khan as Maryam's mother
Samina Ahmed as Maryam's grandmother
Asma Abbas as Maryam's aunt
Kashif Mehmood
Abdullah Ejaz
Kinza Hashmi
Wahaj Khan

See also
 List of programs broadcast by Geo TV
 Geo TV
 List of Pakistani television serials
 Geo Kahani

References

External links

 
2015 Pakistani television series debuts